National Order Party (Millî Nizam Partisi, MNP) was an Islamist political party in Turkey, which adopted the Millî Görüş ideology. It was founded on 26 January 1970 by Necmettin Erbakan. It was closed down on 20 May 1971 by the authorities on the grounds, that it violated the Constitution, specifically the articles dealing with secularism.

It was succeeded by the National Salvation Party (MSP) established in October 1972.

Footnotes

References 
 

 
Political parties established in 1970
Banned Islamist parties in Turkey
Defunct political parties in Turkey
Defunct far-right parties in Turkey
1970 establishments in Turkey
Political parties disestablished in 1971
1971 disestablishments in Turkey